Sangre de Cristo National Heritage Area is a federally designated National Heritage Area in the south central portion of the U.S. state of Colorado. The heritage area includes the San Luis Valley and portions of the Sangre de Cristo Range. The region combines influences of Anglo-American, Hispano-American and Native American influences. It also includes portions of the upper Rio Grande valley.

Extent
The national heritage area includes Alamosa, Costilla, and Conejos counties, and portions of Saguache and Rio Grande counties.  It also includes within its boundaries Great Sand Dunes National Park and Preserve, Baca National Wildlife Refuge, the Sangre de Cristo Wilderness, the South San Juan Wilderness, Sangre de Cristo Wilderness Area, San Luis Wilderness Study Area, Monte Vista National Wildlife Refuge, Alamosa National Wildlife Refuge and the Medano-Zapata Ranch. Other features include the Trujillo Homestead, a National Historic Landmark.

Cultural preservation
The area overlaps with the "Hispano Homeland", the ethnically distinct Hispanic population in the upper Rio Grande Valley and adjoining uplands, as described by academic, Richard Nostrand.
The national heritage area was established to preserve and promote the region's distinctive cultural and natural features.  The San Luis Valley was culturally isolated for much of its history, preserving a distinctive local Spanish dialect and vocabulary. A high proportion of the local population is descended from Hispanos, Spanish colonial settlers who arrived in the area in the 1850s, the first permanent European settlers in Colorado.

Sangre de Cristo National Heritage Area was established by the Omnibus Public Land Management Act of 2009.

Further reading

References

External links
 

 
History of Colorado
History of the Rocky Mountains
National Heritage Areas of the United States
Protected areas established in 2009
Protected areas of Alamosa County, Colorado
Protected areas of Costilla County, Colorado
Protected areas of Conejos County, Colorado
Protected areas of Saguache County, Colorado
Protected areas of Rio Grande County, Colorado
Sangre de Cristo Mountains
2009 establishments in Colorado